Saint-Côme–Linière is a municipality in the Beauce-Sartigan Regional County Municipality in the Chaudière-Appalaches region of Quebec, Canada.  The official spelling given by the Commission de toponymie uses an en dash after "Saint-Côme", but the town's own website uses a second hyphen: Saint-Côme—Linière.  The population is 3,278 as of 2021.

Saint-Côme–Linière was constituted by the amalgamation of the parish municipality of Saint-Côme-de-Kennebec and the village of Linière on August 17, 1994.  Saint-Côme was named after Arabian-born Christian martyr Saint Cosmas and Linière received its name from the Lord who was first granted the land and cultivated fields of flax ("Lin" in French).

Demographics

Population
Population trend:

Elected representatives
Gabriel Giguère, mayor

References

Municipalities in Quebec
Incorporated places in Chaudière-Appalaches